Nemodlenec (Czech for "not praying man") is a Czech novel, written by Karolina Světlá. It was first published in 1873.

1873 Czech novels